Amora London was a European touring exhibition dedicated to love, relationships and sexual wellbeing.

Covering nine zones, London Amora London was the world's first visitor attraction dedicated to these themes. The first city toured was London in England, where Amora ran for 15 months starting April 2007 and was located near Piccadilly Circus in Coventry Street, central London.

Media reports in the United Kingdom from reputable sources such as the BBC discussed the event, leading to titles such as, "Let's Talk Sex In The City" (in reference to the HBO series Sex and the City).

International art dealer of DCA Fine Art, Delia Cabral, was heavily involved in the production of this exhibition.

Comments 
Tracey Cox, a sex and relationship expert, said, "You can walk in to that place knowing nothing about relationships or sex and come out pretty much knowing everything there is to know, and able to go and have a very satisfying relationship."

Dr. Sarah Brewer, director of exhibits at the exhibition said: "The British have been very reserved about sex but are now more open than they have ever been."

Sex therapist Anne Hooper said: "London has needed a public centre for sex information for many years. It’s no coincidence that only now, in 2007, we can be open and frank enough for such an institution to be acceptable."

Kevan Wylie, General Secretary of the European Federation of Sexology commented: "I am pleased to support the launch of Amora. Anything that helps people to have the confidence to share ideas, desires and wishes with their partners must be welcomed and encouraged.

References

External links

2007 establishments in England
2008 disestablishments in England
Tourist attractions in the City of Westminster
Defunct tourist attractions in London
Sexuality in England
Sexuality in popular culture
Sex education in Europe
Animatronic attractions